Sportszerelem is a 1936 Hungarian sports comedy film directed by Zoltán Farkas and László Kardos and starring Kálmán Latabár, Edith Zeisler and Géza Boross. The sports-mad owner of a toothpick factory only allows football players to work for him, and a number of jobs hang on the result of a big match. It was known as Love of Sport in English.

Cast
 Kálmán Latabár ...  Lajos, Szigethy fia 
 Edith Zeisler ...  Radován Mici 
 Géza Boross ...  Szigeti Alajos vezérigazgató 
 Béla Salamon ...  Sáray Márkus szabó 
 Alice Rajna ...  Radovánné 
 Sándor Gál ...  Kiss István tisztviselõ / Charles Wood színész 
 Ferenc Delly ...  Sáray György tisztviselotilde 
 Ibolya Kondor ...  Annie, Szigethy lánya

References

External links

1936 films
Association football films
1930s Hungarian-language films
Films directed by Zoltán Farkas
Hungarian comedy films
1930s sports comedy films
Hungarian black-and-white films
1936 comedy films